The Turkish Women's Handball Super League is the top professional league for Turkish women's handball clubs. It is administered by the Turkey Handball Federation, and the winners are recognized as Turkish champions. Established in the 1978–79 season as the Turkish Women's First League, it was renamed later to Super League. The current title holder is Muratpaşa Bld. SK (2011–12).

Competition format 
The Turkish Women's Handball Super League shares the season style with the men's league. As of the 2022–23 season, it consists of 10 teams, each playing 18 regular season games. The eight teams with most points at the end of the regular season advance to the play-offs. Both first round of play-offs and semi finals will be played in "best of three series". Final will be best of five" series. 

The lowest placed one team of the regular season is directly relegated to the first division, and two teams from first division will be promoted.

Teams

Current teams 
2022–23 season
 Adasokağı SK (Adana)
 Anadolu Üniversitesi GSK (Eskişehir)
 Görele Belediye SK (Giresun)
 İzmir Büyükşehir Belediyesi SK (İzmir)
 Kastamonu Bld. GSK (Kastamonu)
 Konyaaltı Belediyesi SK (Antalya)
 Tekirdağ Süleymanpaşa SK (Tekirdağ)
 Üsküdar Belediyespor (İstanbul)
 Yalıkavak SK (Muğla)
 Yenimahalle Bld. SK (Ankara)

Champions 
(incomplete)
The complete list of champions since 1978:

Medal table 
(incomplete)
 – end of the 2021-22 season, the all-time medal table for the women's championship is as follows:

See also 
 Turkish Handball Super League
 Turkish women in sports

References 

League
Women's handball leagues
Professional sports leagues in Turkey
Handball
Handball leagues in Turkey